No Holding Back is the eleventh studio album by Jamaican reggae fusion singer Wayne Wonder. It was released on March 4, 2003 via VP Records; and it remains Wonder’s only album to date to have charted in the United States. The title of the album comes from the chorus of the single "No Letting Go", which helped make it Wonder's most successful album.

Critical reception 
In a positive review, Vibe magazine's Rob Kenner gave No Holding Back a four-out-of-five disc rating and called it "the right record at the right time" because of its mixture of innovative dancehall and decent R&B-pop songs. William Ruhlmann of AllMusic gave it four out of five stars and said that the reggae-inflected R&B album is generally in the same vein as "No Letting Go", which shows that "the only thing on Wonder's mind is love, and if he has nothing new to say about it, he nevertheless keeps things moving along nicely." In his consumer guide for The Village Voice, Robert Christgau was less enthusiastic and graded the album as a "dud", indicating "a bad record whose details rarely merit further thought."

Track listing

Personnel

Charts

Weekly charts

Year-end charts

References

External links 
 

2003 albums
VP Records albums
Wayne Wonder albums